The Eastern Eagles football team represents Eastern University in college football at the NCAA Division III level. The Eagles are independent but are joining the Middle Atlantic Conference in 2023. The Eagles play their home games in St. Davids, Pennsylvania.

Their head coach is Billy Crocker, who took over the position as for the team's first season in 2022.

Conference affiliations
 Independent (2022)
 Middle Atlantic Conferences (2023–present)

List of head coaches

Key

Coaches

Year-by-year results

Notes

References

 
American football teams established in 2022
2022 establishments in Pennsylvania